Second-seeded Beryl Penrose defeated Thelma Long 6–4, 6–3 in the final to win the women's singles tennis title at the 1955 Australian Championships.

Seeds
The seeded players are listed below. Beryl Penrose is the champion; others show the round in which they were eliminated.

 Thelma Long (finalist)
 Beryl Penrose (champion)
 Jenny Staley (semifinals)
 Mary Carter (semifinals)
 Fay Muller (quarterfinals)
 Daphne Seeney (second round)
 Loris Nichols (second round)
 Norma Ellis (quarterfinals)

Draw

Key
 Q = Qualifier
 WC = Wild card
 LL = Lucky loser
 r = Retired

Finals

Earlier rounds

Section 1

Section 2

External links
 

1955 in women's tennis
1955
1955 in Australian tennis
1955 in Australian women's sport